The Impact Nominal Index or INI is a computer system that enables UK police forces to establish whether any other force holds information on a person of interest.  It was created by the IMPACT Programme led by the Home Office in 2006.
The system was built by the Web Technology Group, a former subsidiary of Cable & Wireless.

The INI is the first system to be delivered by the IMPACT Programme, set up to deliver improvements in the management and sharing of police operational information following Sir Michael Bichard's report on the Soham Murders.

References

External links 

Policy Hub article on INI launch
NPIA IMPACT programme page
Web Technology Group

Law enforcement in the United Kingdom
Government databases in the United Kingdom
Law enforcement databases